Attonda is a genus of moths of the family Erebidae.

Species
 Attonda adspersa (Felder & Rogenhofer 1874)
 Attonda ekeikei (Bethune-Baker 1906)
 Attonda nana (Holland 1894)
 Attonda trifasciata (Moore, 1877)

References
 Attonda at Markku Savela's Lepidoptera and Some Other Life Forms
 Natural History Museum Lepidoptera genus database

Catocalinae